Taras Bidenko (born February 8, 1980 in Kyiv, Ukrainian SSR, Soviet Union) is a German-based professional boxer who fights in the heavyweight division.

Professional career
Bidenko boxed as an amateur before turning professional in June 2000, winning his first fight in Mariupol, Ukraine, in which Bidenko beat Kyiv fighter Stanislav Tomkatchov on the undercard of an Alexander Gurov fight.

In only his fourth professional fight, Bidenko fought Nikolay Valuev in July 2002 in Seoul, South Korea for the Pan Asia PABA Heavyweight Title. Valuev at the time had a record of 28-0 and had vastly more experience than Bidenko at the time and Valuev won the fight on points over twelve rounds.

He later moved to Germany where he lost his second fight to hard-punching Vladimir Virchis by late KO (he was leading at that point) but beat amateur star Alex Mazikin and several clubfighters like George Arias and Cisse Salif.
In 2008 he outpointed respected Michael Sprott.

He was defeated by Denis Boytsov on June 6, 2009 by technical knockout in the sixth round.

Professional boxing record

|-
|align="center" colspan=8|28 Wins (12 knockouts, 16 decisions), 6 Losses (4 knockouts, 2 decisions)
|-
| align="center" style="border-style: none none solid solid; background: #e3e3e3"|Result
| align="center" style="border-style: none none solid solid; background: #e3e3e3"|Record
| align="center" style="border-style: none none solid solid; background: #e3e3e3"|Opponent
| align="center" style="border-style: none none solid solid; background: #e3e3e3"|Type
| align="center" style="border-style: none none solid solid; background: #e3e3e3"|Round
| align="center" style="border-style: none none solid solid; background: #e3e3e3"|Date
| align="center" style="border-style: none none solid solid; background: #e3e3e3"|Location
| align="center" style="border-style: none none solid solid; background: #e3e3e3"|Notes
|-align=center
|Loss
|28-6
|align=left| Artur Szpilka
|
|2
|20/04/2013
|align=left| Hala Podpromie, Rzeszów, Poland
|-
|Loss
|
|align=left| Manuel Charr
|UD
|12
|30/03/2012
|align=left| Maritim Hotel, Cologne, North Rhine-Westphalia
|align=left|
|-
|Win
|
|align=left| Pavels Dolgovs
|UD
|6
|24/09/2011
|align=left| Dima-Sportcenter, Lohbruegge, Hamburg
|align=left|
|-
|Win
|
|align=left| Christian Hammer
|MD
|6
|04/12/2010
|align=left| Sport and Congress Center, Schwerin, Mecklenburg-Vorpommern
|align=left|
|-
|Loss
|
|align=left| Robert Helenius
|RTD
|3
|07/11/2009
|align=left| Nuremberg Arena, Nuremberg, Bavaria
|align=left|
|-
|Loss
|
|align=left| Denis Boytsov
|TKO
|6
|06/06/2009
|align=left| Koenig Pilsener Arena, Oberhausen, North Rhine-Westphalia
|align=left|
|-
|Win
|
|align=left| Michael Sprott
|UD
|10
|31/05/2008
|align=left| Burg-Waechter Castello, Düsseldorf, North Rhine-Westphalia
|align=left|
|-
|Win
|
|align=left| Cisse Salif
|UD
|12
|19/01/2008
|align=left| Burg-Waechter Castello, Düsseldorf, North Rhine-Westphalia
|align=left|
|-
|Win
|
|align=left| George Arias
|UD
|12
|20/10/2007
|align=left| Gerry Weber Stadium, Halle, North Rhine-Westphalia
|align=left|
|-
|Win
|
|align=left| Richel Hersisia
|UD
|12
|30/06/2007
|align=left| Porsche-Arena, Stuttgart, Baden-Württemberg
|align=left|
|-
|Win
|
|align=left| Fernely Feliz
|UD
|12
|17/03/2007
|align=left| Hanns-Martin-Schleyer-Halle, Stuttgart, Baden-Württemberg
|align=left|
|-
|Win
|
|align=left| Ivica Perkovic
|RTD
|5
|05/12/2006
|align=left| Freizeit Arena, Soelden
|align=left|
|-
|Win
|
|align=left| Andreas Sidon
|TKO
|9
|28/10/2006
|align=left| Porsche-Arena, Stuttgart, Baden-Württemberg
|align=left|
|-
|Win
|
|align=left| Oleksiy Mazikin
|MD
|10
|22/08/2006
|align=left| Universum Gym, Wandsbek, Hamburg
|align=left|
|-
|Win
|
|align=left| Fabio Eduardo Moli
|TKO
|6
|12/05/2006
|align=left| Orfeo Superdomo, Cordoba, Argentina
|align=left|
|-
|Win
|
|align=left| Alexey Osokin
|UD
|8
|15/04/2006
|align=left| Maritim Hotel, Magdeburg, Saxony-Anhalt
|align=left|
|-
|Win
|
|align=left| Aldo Colliander
|UD
|8
|24/01/2006
|align=left| Universum Gym, Wandsbek, Hamburg
|align=left|
|-
|Win
|
|align=left| Nuri Seferi
|UD
|10
|28/09/2005
|align=left| Color Line Arena, Altona, Hamburg
|align=left|
|-
|Loss
|
|align=left| Volodymyr Vyrchys
|TKO
|12
|29/03/2005
|align=left| Sporthalle, Wandsbek, Hamburg
|align=left|
|-
|Win
|
|align=left| Constantin Onofrei
|TKO
|7
|14/12/2004
|align=left| Freizeit Arena, Soelden
|align=left|
|-
|Win
|
|align=left| Peter Simko
|TKO
|1
|26/10/2004
|align=left| Scandlines Arena, Rostock, Mecklenburg-Vorpommern
|align=left|
|-
|Win
|
|align=left| Julius Francis
|UD
|10
|21/09/2004
|align=left| Universum Gym, Wandsbek, Hamburg
|align=left|
|-
|Win
|
|align=left| Daniel Frank Silva
|KO
|1
|31/07/2004
|align=left| Hanns-Martin-Schleyer-Halle, Stuttgart, Baden-Württemberg
|align=left|
|-
|Win
|
|align=left| Agustin Corpus
|UD
|6
|24/04/2004
|align=left| Staples Center, Los Angeles, California
|align=left|
|-
|Win
|
|align=left| Siarhei Dychkou
|UD
|6
|30/03/2004
|align=left| Saaltheater Geulen, Aachen, North Rhine-Westphalia
|align=left|
|-
|Win
|
|align=left| Franklin Edmondson
|KO
|1
|17/02/2004
|align=left| Hansehalle, Lübeck, Schleswig-Holstein
|align=left|
|-
|Win
|
|align=left| Edegar Da Silva
|TKO
|1
|31/01/2004
|align=left| Poliedro de Caracas, Caracas
|align=left|
|-
|Win
|
|align=left| Gilberto Melo
|KO
|3
|18/11/2003
|align=left| Universum Gym, Wandsbek, Hamburg
|align=left|
|-
|Win
|
|align=left| Andriy Zadachin
|PTS
|4
|24/10/2002
|align=left| Poltava
|align=left|
|-
|Win
|
|align=left| Vladyslav Andreev
|KO
|4
|10/10/2002
|align=left| Casino Conti, Saint Petersburg
|align=left|
|-
|Loss
|
|align=left| Nikolay Valuev
|UD
|12
|21/07/2002
|align=left| Seoul
|align=left|
|-
|Win
|
|align=left| Suren Kalachyan
|UD
|4
|29/03/2002
|align=left| Circus, Lviv
|align=left|
|-
|Win
|
|align=left| Nikolai Sorinov
|TKO
|2
|06/03/2002
|align=left| Fastiv
|align=left|
|-
|Win
|
|align=left| Stanyslav Tovkachov
|TKO
|5
|17/06/2000
|align=left| Dramatic Theatre, Mariupol
|align=left|
|}

References

External links
 

1980 births
Living people
Sportspeople from Kyiv
Heavyweight boxers
Ukrainian male boxers